Cheboin is a settlement in Kenya's Nandi County. It was part of the former Rift Valley Province.

References 

Populated places in Rift Valley Province